Live! The Farewell Tour is a live album by Cher. The album was recorded at the American Airlines Arena in Miami, Florida, United States on a show from her Living Proof: The Farewell Tour.

Album information
Packed with 18 hits, the album debuted at a peak of 40 on the Billboard 200. The same performance is available as the DVD The Farewell Tour which was recorded live in Miami. The album was also included in the special Edition of The Very Best of Cher. As of January 2006, the album has sold 200,000 copies in the US.

Track listing

Notes
"Believe" features writing contribution by Cher who remains uncredited.

Personnel
Executive Producers: Cher, Roger Davis, and Lindsay Scott
Music Editor: John Van Nest
Recorded: Paul Sandweiss and Dave Zeller
Mastered: Dan Hersch and Bill Inglot
Art Direction: Jeri Heiden and Hugh Brown
Design: Jeri Heiden and Sara Cumings
Live Photos: Frank Micelotta, David Leyes, and Barry King
Product Manager: Mike Engstrom
Project Assistance: David McLees, Steve Woolard, Maria McKenna, and Reggie Collins

Charts

Release history

References

Cher albums
2003 live albums
Articles containing video clips